Antigua and Barbuda lie in the eastern arc of the Leeward Islands of the Lesser Antilles, separating the Atlantic Ocean from the Caribbean Sea.

The largest island of Antigua, is 21 km (about a dozen miles) across and 281 km² (about a hundred square miles) in area. Barbuda covers  while Redonda encompasses . The capital of Antigua and Barbuda is St. John's, located at St. John's Harbour on the northwest coast of Antigua. The principal city of Barbuda is Codrington, located on Codrington Lagoon.

Geology

Antigua and Barbuda both are generally low-lying islands whose terrain has been influenced more by limestone formations than volcanic activity. The highest point on Antigua is Boggy Peak, the remnant of a volcanic crater rising 402 meters (1,319 ft). This mountain is located amid a bulge of hills of volcanic origin in the southwestern part of the island. Lake Estate is the third tallest recorded point on Antigua.

The limestone formations in the northeast and northwest are separated from the southwestern volcanic area by a central plain of clay formations. The shorelines of both islands are greatly indented with beaches, lagoons, and natural harbors. The islands are rimmed by reefs and shoals. There are few streams as rainfall is slight. Both islands lack adequate amounts of fresh groundwater.

Oceanography

Islands

Climate
There is little precipitation because of the islands' low elevations. The pleasant climate fosters tourism. 

In general the wettest period is between September and November. The islands generally experience low humidity and recurrent droughts. 

Hurricanes strike on an average of once a year between July and October. This is the highest temperature to have ever been recorded in Antigua and Barbuda. The coolest period is between December and February.

Environmental issues

Statistics
 Location
 Antigua and Barbuda are Caribbean islands between the Caribbean Sea and the North Atlantic Ocean, east-southeast of Puerto Rico.
 Geographic coordinates
 
 Area
 Total:  (Antigua ; Barbuda )
country comparison to the world: 205
 Land: 
 Note: Includes Redonda, :
 Maritime claims
 Territorial sea: 
 Contiguous zone: 
 Exclusive economic zone:  and 
 Continental shelf:  or to the edge of the continental margin
 TerrainMostly low-lying limestone and coral islands, with some higher volcanic areas
 Land use
 Arable land: 20.5%
 Permanent crops: 2.3%
 Permanent pasture: 9.1%
 Forest: 22.3%
 Other: 57.2% (2011)
 Irrigated land (2012)
 Total renewable water resources
  (2011)
 Freshwater withdrawal (domestic/industrial/agricultural)
 Total: /yr (63%/21%/15%)
 Per capita: /yr (2005)
 Environment - current issues
 Water management, a major concern because of limited natural fresh water resources, is further hampered by the clearing of trees to increase crop production, causing rainfall to run off quickly
 Environmentinternational agreements
 Party to: Biodiversity, Climate Change, Climate Change-Kyoto Protocol, Desertification, Endangered Species, Environmental Modification, Hazardous Wastes, Law of the Sea, Marine Dumping, Nuclear Test Ban, Ozone Layer Protection, Ship Pollution, Wetlands, Whaling
 Geography - note
 Antigua has a deeply indented shoreline with many natural harbors and beaches. Antigua's southernmost point is Cape Shirley. 
 Barbuda has a large western harbor.

Extreme points

Antigua
 Northernmost point – Boon Point
 Easternmost point - Man of War Point, Green Island
 Easternmost point (mainland only) - Neck of Land
 Southernmost point - Nanton Point
 Southernmost point (including Redonda) - headland on southern coast of Redonda (also the southernmost point in Antigua and Barbuda)
 Westernmost point - Five Islands
 Westernmost point (including Redonda) - headland on Western coast of Redonda (also the westernmost point in Antigua and Barbuda)
 Westernmost point (mainland only) - Pearns Point
 Lowest point: Caribbean Sea: 0 m 
 Highest point: Boggy Peak:

Barbuda
 Northernmost point – Goat Point (also the northernmost point in Antigua and Barbuda)
 Easternmost point - unnamed headland on eastern coast (also the easternmost point in Antigua and Barbuda)
 Southernmost point - Coco Point
 Westernmost point - Cedar Tree Point

References